The 2018 San Juan Knights season is the 1st season of the franchise in the Maharlika Pilipinas Basketball League (MPBL).

Key dates
 June 12, 2018: Regular Season Begins.

Current roster

Datu Cup

Standings

Game log

|- style="background:#bfb;"
| 1
| June 20
| Pampanga
| W 93–70
| John Wilson (20)
| De Leon, Jeruta (6)
| Jeruta, Isit (4)
| University of the Assumption Gymnasium
| 1–0
|- style="background:#bfb;"
| 2
| June 30
| Bulacan
| W 94–76
| Aaron Jeruta (18)
| Three players (4)
| Four players (3)
| Valenzuela Astrodome
| 2–0

|- style="background:#bfb;"
| 3
| July 11
| Pasay
| W 89–66
| Mike Ayonayon (16)
| John Wilson (14)
| Gabawan, Cardona (5)
| Filoil Flying V Centre
| 3–0
|- style="background:#bfb;"
| 4
| July 21
| Caloocan
| W 81–77
| Larry Rodriguez (15)
| Larry Rodriguez (11)
| Mark Cardona (6)
| Caloocan Sports Complex
| 4–0

|- style="background:#bfb;"
| 5
| August 1
| Laguna
| W 81–56
| John Wilson (13)
| Larry Rodriguez (7)
| Rodriguez, Wilson (4)
| Filoil Flying V Centre
| 5–0
|- style="background:#fcc;"
| 6
| August 22
| Muntinlupa
| L 71–77
| Larry Rodriguez (14)
| Rodriguez, Clarito (7)
| Aaron Jeruta (5)
| Muntinlupa Sports Complex
| 5–1

|-
| 7
| September 5
| Zamboanga
| 80–59
| 
| 
| 
| Filoil Flying V Centre
| 
|-
| 8
| September 25
| Navotas
| 81–74
| 
| 
| 
| Strike Gymnasium
| 

|-
| 
| 
| 
| 
| 
| 
| 
| 
| 

|-
| 
| November 21
| Manila
| 84–80
| 
| 
| 
| Filoil Flying V Centre
| 

|-
| 
| 
| 
| 
| 
| 
| 
| 
| 

|-
| 
| 
| 
| 
| 
| 
| 
| 
| 

|-
| 
| February 11
| Quezon City
| 68–50
| 
| 
| 
| Filoil Flying V Centre
| 

|-
| 
| 
| 
| 
| 
| 
| 
| 
|

Playoffs

Brackets

Game log

|- style="background:#bfb;"
| 1
| March 13
| Navotas
| W 81–76
| 
| 
| 
|
| 
|- style="background:#bfb;"
| 2
| March 18
| Navotas
| W 75–69
| 
| 
| 
| 
| 

|- style="background:#bfb;"
| 3
| March 26
| Quezon City
| W 94–86
| 
| 
| 
|
| 
|- style="background:#bfb;"
| 4
| March 28
| Quezon City
| W 106–81
|
| 
| 
|
| 

|- style="background:#fcc;"
| 5
| April 4
| Manila
| L 91–88
| 
| 
| 
| Filoil Flying V Centre
| 
|- style="background:#bfb;"
| 6
| April 6
| Manila
| W 92–90
|
| 
|
| San Andres Sports Complex
| 
|- style="background:#bfb;"
| 7
| April 8
| Manila
| W 85–74
|
| 
|
| Filoil Flying V Centre
| 

|- style="background:#bfb;"
| 8
| April 11
| Davao Occidental
| W 84–74
| 
| 
| 
| Davao City Recreation Center
| 1–0
|- style="background:#fcc;"
| 9
| April 13
| Davao Occidental
| L 60–67
| 
| 
| 
| RMC Gymnasium
| 1–1
|- style="background:#bfb;"
| 10 
| April 16
| Davao Occidental
| W 67–62
| 
| 
| 
| Filoil Flying V Centre
| 2–1
|- style="background:#fcc;"
| 11
| April 22
| Davao Occidental
| L 66–77
| 
| 
| 
| Filoil Flying V Centre
| 2–2
|- style="background:#bfb;"
| 12
| April 25
| Davao Occidental
| W 87–86
| 
| 
| 
| RMC Gymnasium
| 3–2

Awards
 Mike Ayonayon - Finals MVP

Awards

Best Player of the Game

References

San Juan Knights
San Juan Knights Season, 2018